Girton is a village and civil parish in Nottinghamshire, England. According to the 2001 census it had a population of 143, reducing slightly to 140 at the 2011 Census. It is located 17 miles west of Lincoln.

The parish church of St Cecilia is a small aisleless church almost totally rebuilt in 1879. Fleet Cottage is a rare example of an early north-east Nottinghamshire cottage of the 17th century, with a timber-framed upper storey on a limestone ground floor.
Girton has many floodplains from the River Trent that support many species of plants and wildlife such as Meadow Foxtail and meadowsweet

A reference to Girton appears in John Marius Wilson's Imperial Gazetteer of England and Wales (1870-72).  The village was said to have 46 houses and a property value of £2,056.

References

External links

Villages in Nottinghamshire
Civil parishes in Nottinghamshire
Newark and Sherwood